WORDTheatre is a non-profit organization founded in 2003 that champions literature by staging live readings of contemporary short stories and curating original themed productions. Based primarily in Los Angeles, New York, and London, these performances, both live and recorded, notably feature well-known authors, actors, and musicians.

History
WORDTheatre was founded in 2003 by Cedering Fox, producer, theatre director, and voiceover artist who still serves as the organization's Artistic Director. Fox is the daughter of the Swedish-American award-winning poet, writer, and artist Siv Cedering. In 1989, Fox was asked to partner with Darrell Larson, on The Great Writers Series: Literary Evenings at The Met in Los Angeles. The series featured authors Sam Shepard, Peter Matthiessen, James Ellroy and actors Ed Harris, Holly Hunter and Bill Pullman, among others, and ran for three years. It was broadcasting weekly on NPR’s KCRW. The station then hired Fox to direct seven and a half hours of Isak Dinesen stories performed by an all-star cast and scored by composer Jonathan Sacks. Realizing her passion for the form, Fox launched WORDTheatre in 2003 at the Canal Club in Venice, California. Later that year, WORDTheatre debuted in London under producer Kirsty Peart, herself a writer of animation for film and television. Their ongoing collaboration has resulted in hundreds of bespoke productions in the US and the UK.

From 2010 to 2016 WORDTheatre was associated with the UK’s Sunday Times EFG Private Bank Short Story Award, “the world’s richest short story prize,” with performers reading the six shortlisted stories to live audiences annually in London, England. WORDTheatre also headlined the Literary Arena at the Latitude Festival for seven consecutive years. In 2013, WORDTheatre debuted its original space exploration-themed production, "In the Cosmos", with a 44-piece orchestra at Wilderness Festival, UK, which was labeled by MTV as the “Most Dynamic And Extravagant Act.” "In the Cosmos" was restaged to acclaim at the Ford Amphitheatre in Los Angeles on August 26, 2017.

Collaborations with MacArthur 'Genius' grant recipient John Edgar Wideman have resulted in several notable productions including 2012's 'Storytales' at the John Anson Ford Theater featuring such notable actors as Sterling K. Brown, Lorraine Toussaint, Keith David, Marla Gibbs, Brent Jennings, Omar Dorsey, and Nicki Micheaux, to name a few; and the John Edgar Wideman Experience which was staged in two different incarnations at Pittsburgh's August Wilson Theater in 2017 and the Hall of Liberty in Los Angeles in 2018. In 2022, Alison Emilio came on board as WORDTheatre's Executive Director.

Authors
Since 2003, WORDTheatre has showcased the works of contemporary short story authors. It brings to life the works of authors such as Charles Baxter, Brian Doyle, TC Boyle, Richard Bausch, John Edgar Wideman, Pamela Painter, Percival Everett, Anthony Doerr to mainstream live audiences.

Venues
WORDTheatre has performed in venues including the Royal Festival Hall and Queen Elizabeth Hall on South Bank, the St James Theatre, The Arts Club in London and Chatsworth House in Derbyshire; Soho House West Hollywood, The Geffen Playhouse, The Broad, the Grammy Museum, the Microsoft Lounge and the Ford Amphitheatre in Los Angeles; and Soho House New York, the East Hamptons Guild Hall and NeueHouse in New York.

Writer’s retreat
Annually WORDTheatre hosts a writers' retreat in Edale, England (United Kingdom). Previous leaders of the workshops were:

2011 Ron Carlson
2012 Dan Chaon
2013 David Means
2014 Andre Dubus III
2015 Richard Bausch
2016/2017 Pamela Painter
2018 Margaret McMullan
2019 Peter Orner
2021 Ron Carlson
2022 Dan Chaon

Talent 
WORDTheatre is known for performances by well-known stage, film, and television actors, including Alfred Molina, Alfre Woodard, Amanda Seyfried, Bellamy Young, Ben Miller, Bill Pullman, CCH Pounder, Chris Cooper, Craig T. Nelson, Damian Lewis, Damien Molony, Darren Criss, David Soul, Ed Harris, Elisabeth Moss, Elizabeth McGovern, Emily Watson, Gary Dourdan, Gemma Chan, Harriet Walter, Ian Hart, James Franco, Jason George, Jeff Goldblum, Jessica Capshaw, JK Simmons, Julianna Margulies, Juliet Stevenson, Kevin McKidd, Linda Cardellini, Mark Ruffalo, Mayim Bialik, Minnie Driver, Rhashan Stone, Robert Pine, Sarah Paulson, and Tony Shalhoub.

Charitable works
WORDTheatre is a non-profit organization. In addition to championing contemporary literature through live and recorded performances, it has its own education outreach program WORDTheatre in the Schools (WITS). Since its inception in 2011 the WITS program has served many Los Angeles Title 1 Schools. 
Many of the same actors and authors who perform at WordTheatre’s main events volunteer their time to participate in the WTIS program, including JK Simmons, Bellamy Young, Toni Trucks, Jason Isaacs, Sterling K Brown, and Ryan Michelle Bathe. In 2015 WordTheatre expanded the WTIS program internationally to also include under-resourced schools in the United Kingdom.

WORDTheatre is also known for their benefit work, curating and performing original themed productions for charities such as Autism Speaks, NARSAD, the One Billion Rising movement dedicated to ending rape and violence against women, Anaphylaxis and The Parkinsons Appeal for Parkinsons disease in the UK.

WORDTheatre began staging bi-annual benefits for the Pushcart Prize, honoring literary excellence, in East Hampton, New York, in 2006.

References

External links
WordTheatre®

2003 establishments in California
Non-profit organizations based in Los Angeles
Performing groups established in 2003
Theatre companies in Los Angeles